Charles Ernest Catcheside-Warrington (1859–1937) was an English Music hall artist and songwriter from the late 19th century who became a recording artist, record producer and a collector and arranger of "Geordie" songs.

Life
Catcheside-Warrington was born Charles Ernest Catcheside in Elswick in 1859, the son of Robert and Louisa Mary Catcheside (née Gowdy). He became a successful star in the national Music hall, based in London. He made his first recording on a cylinder in 1883. He eventually moved back to Newcastle in 1907, where he recorded "Come Geordie ha'd the bairn," Last Neet," and "The Neebors Doon Belaw."  These successful recordings were followed by recitations, sketches and stories, including "The Cullercoats Fishwife," "Census Man and The Fishwife," and "School Inspector." In 1911, Catcheside-Warrington recorded "Hawke's Man at the Battle of Waterloo," "Cushie Butterfield," and "The Paanshop's Bleezin."

During the boom in the music scene during the late 1920s and early 1930s, Catcheside-Warrington came out of retirement to make additional recordings.

He was a partner in a firm of market gardeners, nurserymen and seedsmen.
He died in Northumberland on 31 July 1937.

Works

Compilations
 Four volumes of his “Tyneside Songs” were published between 1912 and 1927, the contents of which are now of great historical value.
 Six volumes of his Tyneside Stories & Recitations were published in 1917 (according to "A Dictionary of North East Dialect" 2005 ) or “undated but probably sometime in the 1930s” according to other current resale documents.

Songs, verse and prose
 Bogey Cheeky Band
 Cuddy Cairt (The)
 Flying Jacket (The)
 Girl Who Lost Her Character (The)
 Jack’s Apology
 Owther
 Pitman’s Piano (The)
 Ringing the Pig
 Thors alwes the Dole
 Thor's ne Pig
 When I was a soldier

Recordings
Four of his songs are available on CD: “Various Artists – Wor Nanny's A Mazer: Early Recordings Of Artists From The North East 1904–1933” (on Phonograph, PHCD2K1)  :-
 Wor Nanny’s a mazer
 Cushie Butterfield
 The Cliffs of Old Tynemouth
 Last Night
A recording of the song "The Pawnshop’s Bleezin'” is available on CD: “The Keel  Row – Songs of the Urban Tyne" (MWMCDSP38).

See also
Geordie dialect words
Catcheside-Warrington's Tyneside Songs
Catcheside-Warrington's Tyneside Stories & Recitations

References

External links
 Tyneside Song
 C. Ernest Catcheside-Warrington
  The London Gazette 5 May 1922
 Bards of Newcastle

1937 deaths
1859 births
English music publishers (people)
English antiquarians
Music hall performers
English songwriters
People from Newcastle upon Tyne (district)
Musicians from Tyne and Wear
Geordie songwriters